Aves is the class of birds.

Aves may also refer to:

 Aves Island, a Caribbean island administered by Venezuela
 Aves (Santo Tirso), a town and a parish in northern Portugal
 C.D. Aves, a Portuguese football (soccer) club
 Las Aves Archipelago, a group of islands off the coast of Venezuela
 The Birds (play)  or Aves, a comedy play by Aristophanes
 Aves (surname), people with the name

See also
 AVE (disambiguation)
 Avis (disambiguation)
 The Avenues (disambiguation)